Gerić is a surname. Notable people with the surname include:

Andrija Gerić (born 1977), Serbian volleyball player
Dejan Gerić (born 1988), Slovenian footballer
Dragoslava Gerić (1947–2011), Serbian and Yugoslavian basketball player

See also
Geri (surname)
Gerig